
Myślibórz County is a unit of territorial administration and local government (powiat) in the West Pomeranian Voivodeship (a voivodeship, or province that is found in northwestern Poland along the German border). It came into being on January 1, 1999, as a result of the Polish local government reforms passed in 1998.

As of 2006 its total population is 67,412, out of which the population of Barlinek is 14,156, that of Dębno is 13,903, that of Myślibórz is 11,867, and the rural population is 27,486.

Neighbouring counties
Myślibórz County is bordered by Gryfino County to the northwest, Pyrzyce County and Stargard County to the north, Choszczno County to the northeast, Strzelce-Drezdenko County to the east, and Gorzów County to the southeast. It also borders Germany to the west.

Administrative division
The county is subdivided into five gminas. Two of the gminas are rural, whereas the other three have both urban and rural qualities. These are listed in the following table, in descending order of population.

References
Polish official population figures 2006

 
Land counties of West Pomeranian Voivodeship